The World Centre is an office skyscraper located in Makati, Philippines. It is owned by Megaworld Corp. It stands at 152.4 metres (500 feet), and is located on the largest central business district of the country.

Design
The World Centre building was designed and planned by Filipino architectural firm W.V. Coscolluela & Associates, in cooperation with international architectural firm Skidmore, Owings and Merrill. Structural engineering consultancy work was done by Ove Arup and Partners. The building's exterior is clad with glossy curtain walls, and has a spire for communications and transmission. The building also has a helicopter deck area at the roof deck.

Occupants
The World Centre houses the Embassy of China's consular section and military attaché office.

See also
 List of tallest buildings in Metro Manila

References

External links
 The World Centre at Emporis
 The World Centre at Skyscraperpage.com

Skyscrapers in Makati
Skyscraper office buildings in Metro Manila
Skidmore, Owings & Merrill buildings
Office buildings completed in 1996